Leptophobia eleone, the silky wanderer or eleone white, is a butterfly in the family Pieridae. It is found from Colombia to Bolivia. The habitat consists of cloud forests.

Adults have black markings on the upperside. The underside of the hindwings is silky greenish white. Adults feed on the nectar of various flowers, including Lantana species.

The larvae feed on Tropaeolum species.

Subspecies
The following subspecies are recognised:
Leptophobia eleone eleone (Colombia)
Leptophobia eleone luca Fruhstorfer, 1907 (Ecuador, Bolivia)

References

Pierini
Butterflies described in 1847
Pieridae of South America